Poland competed at the 2009 World Championships in Athletics from 15 to 23 August. A team of over 40 athletes was announced in preparation for the competition. Selected athletes have achieved one of the competition's qualifying standards. The squad includes both Polish athletes who were 2008 Olympics medalists: Tomasz Majewski (gold at shot put and 2009 world leaders), and Piotr Małachowski (silver at discus throw). Anna Rogowska (third in 2004 Olympics at pole vault) and Szymon Ziółkowski (2000 Olympic champion in the hammer throw) also participated in the Championships. 
In the women's hammer throw, Anita Włodarczyk of Poland won gold medal with a distance of 77,96m, which is a new world record.

Poland won 8 medals in the Championships and was 4th rank among all participating countries Medal Table. It is the best result of Poland of all World Championships in Athletics.

Medalists

Results
(q – qualified, NM – no mark, SB – season best)

Men
Track and road events

Field events

Women 
Track and road events

Field events

Combined events – Heptathlon

References

External links 
 Official competition website

Nations at the 2009 World Championships in Athletics
World Championships in Athletics
Poland at the World Championships in Athletics